Tappeh-ye Lal Mohammad (also Romanized as Tappeh-ye Lāl Moḩammad) is a village in Sangan Rural District, in the Central District of Khash County, Sistan and Baluchestan Province, Iran. At the 2006 census, its population was 155, in 35 families.

References 

Populated places in Khash County